Gerald Randall Harrison (born 15 April 1972 in Lambeth) is an English former professional footballer who played as a midfielder in the Football League for Watford, Bristol City, Cardiff City, Hereford United, Burnley, Sunderland, Luton Town, Hull City and Halifax Town. He went on to play non-league football.

References

External links

Profile at Hyde United F.C.

1972 births
Living people
Footballers from Lambeth
English footballers
Association football midfielders
Watford F.C. players
Bristol City F.C. players
Cardiff City F.C. players
Huddersfield Town A.F.C. players
Hereford United F.C. players
Burnley F.C. players
Sunderland A.F.C. players
Luton Town F.C. players
Hull City A.F.C. players
Halifax Town A.F.C. players
Prestwich Heys A.F.C. players
Leigh Genesis F.C. players
York City F.C. players
Northwich Victoria F.C. players
Hyde United F.C. players
English Football League players
National League (English football) players